There have been four baronetcies created for persons with the surname O'Brien, one in the Baronetage of Ireland and three in the Baronetage of the United Kingdom.

The O'Brien Baronetcy, of Leaghmenagh in the County of Clare, was created in the Baronetage of Ireland on 9 November 1686; for more information see Baron Inchiquin.

The O'Brien Baronetcy, of Merrion Square in Dublin and Boris-in-Ossory in Queen's County, was created in the Baronetage of the United Kingdom on 25 September 1849 for Timothy O'Brien. He was a merchant, Lord Mayor of Dublin and Liberal Member of Parliament for Cashel. The second Baronet represented King's County in the House of Commons as a Liberal for over thirty years. The third Baronet was Lord Lieutenant of County Cork. In 2017 the seventh and present Baronet (Devin James Connor O’Brien) claimed succession and was listed in the Official Roll of the Baronetage. The baronetcy was considered temporarily dormant from 2013 to 2017 while this claim was verified. For more information, follow this link.

The O'Brien Baronetcy was created in the Baronetage of the United Kingdom on 28 September 1891; for more information see Baron O'Brien.

The O'Brien Baronetcy was created in the Baronetage of the United Kingdom on 15 January 1916; for more information see Baron Shandon.

O'Brien baronets of Leaghmenagh (1686)
see Baron Inchiquin

O'Brien baronets, of Merrion Square and Boris-in-Ossory (1849)
Holders and intermittent generations:
Sir Timothy O'Brien, 1st Baronet (1787–1862)
Sir Patrick O'Brien, 2nd Baronet (1823–1895)
Sir Timothy Carew O'Brien, 3rd Baronet (1861–1948)
Sir Robert Rollo Gillespie O'Brien, 4th Baronet (1901–1952)
Sir John Edmond Noel O'Brien, 5th Baronet (1899–1969)
Sir David Edmond O'Brien, 6th Baronet (1902–1982)
John David O'Brien (1928–1980)
Timothy John O'Brien (1958-)

The baronetcy is presently considered Dormant as the present holder has not proven his claim to the title.

The heir presumptive after the presumed-only holder is the other patrilineal grandson of the 6th Baronet, James Patrick O'Brien (born 1964).

O'Brien baronets (1891)
see Baron O'Brien

O'Brien baronets (1916)
see Baron Shandon

See also
 O'Brien dynasty

Notes

References
Kidd, Charles, Williamson, David (editors). Debrett's Peerage and Baronetage (1990 edition). New York: St Martin's Press, 1990, 

Baronetcies in the Baronetage of Ireland
Baronetcies in the Baronetage of the United Kingdom
O'Brien dynasty
1686 establishments in Ireland
1849 establishments in the United Kingdom